The Nika Award (sometimes styled NIKA Award) is the main annual national film award in Russia, presented by the Russian Academy of Cinema Arts and Science, and seen as the national equivalent of the Oscars.

History
The award was established in 1987 in Moscow by Yuli Gusman, and ostensibly modelled on the Oscars. The Russian award takes its name from Nike, the goddess of victory. Accordingly, the prize is modelled after the sculpture of the Winged Victory of Samothrace. 

The oldest professional film award in Russia, the Nika Award was established during the final years of USSR by the influential Russian Union of Filmmakers.

At first the awards were judged by all the members of the Union of Filmmakers. In the early 1990s, a special academy, consisting of over 500 academicians, was elected for distributing the awards, which recognise outstanding achievements in cinema (not television) produced in Russia and the Commonwealth of Independent States. 

In 2002 Nikita Mikhalkov established the competing Golden Eagle Award, modelled on the Golden Globe Awards as it honours both film and television production of Russia.

Description
The award name is sometimes styled NIKA Awards.

The Nika Awards ceremony is broadcast annually and attracts huge publicity across Russia  and the Commonwealth of Independent States.

Soviet awards 

1988
Georgia's Tengiz Abuladze won Best Picture and Best Director for Repentance. 
1989
Russia's Aleksandr Proshkin won Best Picture for The Cold Summer of 1953, but other winners included films produced decades earlier and suppressed by Soviet censorship. For example, Alfred Schnittke won Best Music for the 1967 film Commissar, and Andron Konchalovsky was named Best Director for Asya Klyachina's Story, also filmed in 1967.
1990
Armenia's Sergei Parajanov took 4 awards including Best Picture and Best Director for his "Ashik Kerib".
1991
Ukraine's Kira Muratova won Best Picture for The Asthenic Syndrome, while Stanislav Govorukhin was named Best Director for We Can't Live Like This. Innokenty Smoktunovsky took the award as Best Actor.
1992
Eldar Ryazanov's Promised Heaven triumphed at the last all-Soviet ceremony, taking the awards for Best Picture and Best Directing. Oleg Yankovsky and Inna Churikova were named Best Actor and Best Actress.

Russian awards 
 
1993
Pyotr Todorovsky, a veteran filmmaker, won Best Picture for Encore, Once More Encore!. Nikita Mikhalkov was named Best Director for Urga (Close to Eden) and Mikhail Vartanov won the Best Documentary Film for Parajanov: The Last Spring. Vadim Yusov was named Best Cinematographer for Georgi Daneliya's Pasport.
1994
Vladimir Khotinenko won Best Picture for Makarov. Vadim Yusov was named Best Cinematographer for Ivan Dykhovichny's Prorva. 
1995
Kira Muratova triumphed again, taking the awards for Best Picture and Best Directing for Passions. The Lifetime Achievement Award went to Sergei Gerasimov's widow, Tamara Makarova.
1996
Aleksandr Rogozhkin won Best Picture and Best Director for comedy Peculiarities of the National Hunt.
1997
Sergei Bodrov won Best Picture and Best Director for Prisoner of the Mountains. The Lifetime Achievement Award went to Georgy Zhzhonov.
1998
Pavel Chukhrai won Best Picture and Best Director for The Thief.
1999
Aleksei Balabanov won Best Picture for Of Freaks and Men. Otar Ioseliani was named Best Director for Brigands-Chapter VII
2000
Aleksei German won Best Picture and Best Director for Khrustalyov, My Car!.Mikhail Ulyanov was named Best Actor for The Rifleman of the Voroshilov Regiment.Valeriy Priyomykhov won Best Screenplay for the Who, If Not Us
2001
Aleksei Uchitel won Best Picture for His Wife's Diary. Bakhtyar Khudojnazarov was named Best Director for Luna Papa. The Life Achievement Award was presented to Vyacheslav Tikhonov.
2002
Alexander Sokurov won Best Picture and Best Director for Taurus. The Lifetime Achievement Award was given to Aleksei Batalov.
2003
Aleksandr Rogozhkin again won Best Picture and Best Director for The Cuckoo. Oleg Yankovsky was again named Best Actor.
2004
Andrey Zvyagintsev won Best Picture for Vozvrashcheniye. Vadim Abdrashitov was named Best Director, and Inna Churikova again won the award as Best Actress. The Lifetime Achievement Award was given to Pyotr Todorovsky.
2005
Dmitry Meskhiev won Best Picture for Our Own, while Kira Muratova was named Best Director for The Tuner. Bogdan Stupka was named Best Actor, and Alla Demidova took the award as Best Actress. Eduard Artemyev was awarded for Best Music. The Lifetime Achievement Awards were presented to Vadim Yusov and Nonna Mordyukova.
2006
Fyodor Bondarchuk won Best Picture for The 9th Company, while Aleksei German Jr was named Best Director for Garpastum. Yevgeny Mironov and Alisa Freindlikh were honored as Best Actor and Best Actress, respectively. Marlen Khutsiev was presented the Lifetime Achievement Award.
2007
Pavel Lungin won Best Picture and Best Director for The Island. Pyotr Mamonov and Viktor Sukhorukov took the awards for Best Actor and Best Supporting Actor for their parts in this film. Fyodor Khitruk received the Lifetime Achievement Award.
2008
Sergey Bodrov won Best Film and Best Director for Mongol. Sergey Garmash was named Best Actor for Nikita Mikhalkov's 12, and Leonid Bronevoy was named Best Supporting Actor. The Lifetime Achievement Award went to Georgi Daneliya.
2009
Valery Todorovsky won Best Picture for Hipsters. Aleksei German Jr was named Best Director for Paper Soldier. The Lifetime Achievement Award went to Aleksei German Sr.
2010
Andrei Khrzhanovsky won Best Picture for A Room and a Half. The Best Actress Award was won by Svetlana Kryuchkova for her role in Bury Me Behind the Baseboard, and the Best Actor Award was won by Vladimir Ilyin for his role in Ward No. 6 and posthumously by Oleg Yankovsky for his roles in Anna Karenina and Tsar.
2011
Alexei Uchitel won Best Picture for The Edge. Alexei Popogrebski was named Best Director for How I Ended This Summer.
2012
Andrei Smirnov won Best Picture for Once Upon a Time There Lived a Simple Woman. Andrey Zvyagintsev - Best Director for Elena.
2013
Best Feature Film -- Faust, directed by Alexander Sokurov
2014
Best Feature Film 
Winner: 
The Geographer Drank His Globe Away, directed by Alexander Veledinsky
Nominees:
Kiss!, directed by Zhora Krizovnicka
A Long and Happy Life, directed by Boris Khlebnikov
Metro, directed by Anton Megerdichev
Stalingrad, directed by Fedor Bondarchuk
Best Film of the CIS and Baltic: The Excursionist, Khaytarma
2015
Best Feature Film -- Miliyy Khans, dorogoy Pyotr, directed and produced by Aleksandr Mindadze 
Best Documentary -- Valentina Kropivnitskaya v poiskakh poteryannogo raya (In Search of a Lost Paradise), directed by Evgeniy Tsymbal, produced by Alexander Smoljanski

2017
Best Feature Film -- Paradise, directed and produced by Andrei Konchalovsky
2019
Best Feature Film -- A Frenchman, directed by Andrei Smirnov

See also
 Cinema of Russia
 Cinema of the Soviet Union
 List of Russian films
 History of Russian animation

References

External links 
 

Russian film awards
Soviet awards
Awards established in 1987
1987 establishments in the Soviet Union
Nika Awards